Tierra Amarilla may refer to:

 Tierra Amarilla, Chile, a commune in Chile
 Tierra Amarilla, New Mexico, a census-designated place in New Mexico
 Tierra Amarilla Air Force Station, a closed United States Air Force station in New Mexico
 Tierra Amarilla Historic District, a listed historic district in Tierra Amarilla, New Mexico